Alvin B. Jackson is a former Republican Senator for Utah State's 14th district. He was appointed by Governor Gary Herbert to fill a vacant seat caused by the resignation of John Valentine, who resigned to head the Utah Tax Commission. He resigned in July 2016 to take a job out of state, and was replaced by another appointee, Daniel Hemmert.

Personal life 
Alvin Jackson is African-American. Jackson was born in Buford, South Carolina, and raised in Silver Spring, Maryland.

He has a BS degree in Aviation Business Administration from Embry–Riddle Aeronautical University. While there he played both basketball and baseball.

He also has an MBA from Johns Hopkins University. While living in Washington, D.C., shortly after completing his MBA Jackson joined the Church of Jesus Christ of Latter-day Saints. A year later he married his wife Juleen, a Euro-American who was raised in Utah. For a time Jackson served as bishop of the Kensington Ward located in Kensington, Maryland.

Alvin Jackson has spent much of his life working as a consultant. He currently serves principal of his own consulting firm, The Jackson Group, which provides strategic council in the areas of leadership, business development, and skills. Prior to moving to Utah Jackson worked in Washington, D.C., as a consultant providing council on matters involving national security and transportation. Jackson was also a vice president for a subsidiary to Boeing called Insitu. Alvin has a son, Frank Jackson, a former Duke basketball player  who was selected in the second round of the 2017 NBA Draft. He currently plays for the Salt Lake City Stars.

Jackson has served as a member of the BYU Marriott School National Advisory Council since 2006.

Political career 
Senator Jackson was appointed by Governor Herbert to fill the seat of John Valentine in 2014. Since 2014 he has been serving as Senator of Utah's 14th district. Senator Jackson has stated that he does not intend to seek reelection in 2016.

During the 2016 legislative session Senator Jackson was on the following committees:
 Social Services Appropriations Subcommittee
 Senate Government Operations and Political Subdivisions Committee
 Senate Transportation, Public Utilities, Energy, and Technology Committee (Chair)

Legislation

2016 sponsored bills

Notable legislation 
During the 2016 legislative session Jackson sponsored a resolution calling for the repeal of the 17th amendment. The resolution passed both the House and Senate.

References

External links 

 Biography Project Vote Smart

Living people
Republican Party Utah state senators
Latter Day Saints from Maryland
Year of birth missing (living people)
Place of birth missing (living people)
People from Highland, Utah
Johns Hopkins Carey Business School alumni
Embry–Riddle Aeronautical University alumni
African-American state legislators in Utah
African-American Latter Day Saints
Converts to Mormonism
Latter Day Saints from Utah
People from Lancaster County, South Carolina
Embry–Riddle Eagles baseball players
21st-century African-American people